The 1995 Brownlow Medal was the 68th year the award was presented to the player adjudged the fairest and best player during the Australian Football League (AFL) home-and-away season. Paul Kelly of the Sydney Swans won the medal by polling twenty-one votes during the 1995 AFL season. For the first time, the State Government legalised betting on the Brownlow Medal, a move which concerned some due to the high potential for corruption. The pre-count favourites for the medal were Wayne Carey (3/1), Wayne Campbell (7/2), Peter Matera (10/1), James Hird and Craig Bradley (each 12/1). Eventual winner Paul Kelly was considered a 25/1 outside chance.

Leading vote-getters 

* The player was ineligible to win the medal due to suspension by the AFL Tribunal during the year.

References 

Brownlow Medal
1995
Brownlow Medal